Andrew Davey (born 29 November 1991) is an Australian professional rugby league footballer who plays as a  forward for the Canterbury Bankstown Bulldogs in the NRL.  

He previously played for the Parramatta Eels and Manly Sea Eagles in the National Rugby League.

Background
Born in Maryborough, Queensland, Davey played his junior rugby league for the Emerald Cowboys.

Playing career
In 2016, Davey joined the Mackay Cutters in the Queensland Cup on a train-and-trial deal, later earning a full-time contract with the club. That season, he won the club's Rookie of the Year award. In 2017, he co-captained the Cutters alongside Setaimata Sa.

In 2018, Davey signed with the Townsville Blackhawks. In 2019, Davey joined the Parramatta Eels NRL squad. He spent the season with their New South Wales Cup feeder club, Wentworthville, playing in their Grand Final loss to Newtown.

2020
In round 10 of the 2020 NRL season, Davey made his first grade debut for Parramatta against the Manly-Warringah Sea Eagles. In his second NRL appearance, Davey played 51 minutes off the bench replacing Ryan Matterson who was ruled out through HIA in Parramatta's 26-16 win over the Wests Tigers. At 28 years and 233 days old, he became the fourth-oldest debutant in the NRL era (since 1998) after Brian Carney, Darren Nicholls, and Darren Porter.

On 12 October, Davey signed a two-year deal to join Manly-Warringah.

2021
Davey made his club debut for Manly in round 1 of the 2021 NRL season against the Sydney Roosters at the SCG.
After Manly's round 2 loss against South Sydney, it was revealed that Davey had suffered a season ending knee injury.

2022
Davey played a total of 18 games for Manly in the 2022 NRL season scoring three tries.  Manly would finish the year in 11th place and miss out on the finals.

References

External links
Parramatta Eels profile
NRL profile

1991 births
Living people
Australian rugby league players
Parramatta Eels players
Manly Warringah Sea Eagles players
Mackay Cutters players
Townsville Blackhawks players
Wentworthville Magpies players
Rugby league second-rows
Rugby league players from Maryborough, Queensland